Veterinary chiropractic, also known as animal chiropractic, is the practice of spinal manipulation or manual therapy for animals. Veterinary chiropractors typically treat horses, racing greyhounds, and pets. Veterinary chiropractic is a fast-developing field that is complementary to the conventional approach.  Veterinary chiropractic is considered a controversial method due to limited evidence that exists on the efficacy of osteopathic or chiropractic methods in equine therapy. There is limited evidence supporting the effectiveness of spinal manipulation or mobilization for equine pain management, and the efficacy of specific equine manual therapy techniques is mostly anecdotal.

Contrary to traditional medicine which deals with pathology, chiropractic therapies refer to a holistic medical approach that focuses on restoring homeostasis in the body and allows for the body to naturally heal itself. There is some degree of risk associated with even skilled manipulation in animals as the potential for injury exists with any technique used. It remains controversial within certain segments of the veterinary and chiropractic profession.

The founder of chiropractic, Daniel David Palmer, used the method on animals, partly to challenge claims that the placebo effect was responsible for favorable results in humans. Chiropractic treatment of large animals dates back to the early 1900s. , many states in the US provide statutory or regulatory guidelines for the practice of chiropractic and related treatments on animals, generally requiring some form of veterinary involvement.

History
Chiropractic treatment of large animals dates back to the early 1900s. The founder of the field of chiropractic, spiritualist Daniel David Palmer, used the method on animals, partly to challenge claims that the placebo effect was responsible for favorable results in humans.  In the early 1980s, it began to be seen on the margins of veterinary medicine. By the late 1980s, a veterinarian who also was a chiropractor, Sharon Willoughby, developed a training program. With the emergence of veterinary chiropractic, both doctors of chiropractic (DCs) and veterinary medicine (DVMs) became able to take additional training to become certified in veterinary chiropractic.

Efficacy and safety 
Aside from the common treatment of racehorses, greyhounds, and pets, some animal chiropractors perform adjustments on exotic animals such as birds, dolphins, elephants, iguanas, turkeys, pigs, and llamas. Veterinary chiropractic is considered a controversial method due to limited evidence that exists on the efficacy of osteopathic or chiropractic methods in equine therapy. There is limited evidence supporting the effectiveness of spinal manipulation or mobilization for equine pain management, and the efficacy of specific equine manual therapy techniques is mostly anecdotal. One study done in 2021 on Boxers showed successful signs that veterinary chiropractic treatment may be used to reduce the probability of early development of spondylosis in young Boxers. Another study done on racehorses found significant changes in thoracolumbar and pelvic kinematics with veterinary chiropractic treatment but stated increased numbers of horses and clinical trials are needed. The practice remains controversial.

There is some degree of risk associated with even skilled manipulation in animals as the potential for injury exists with any technique used. This risk may increase in the presence of structural diseases, such as equine cervical vertebral malformation (CVM) or canine intervertebral disk disease. Horses have been hurt by very forceful animal chiropractic movements. Adjusting the spine of a dog with a degenerative disk runs the risk of serious injury to the spinal cord.

Practice

Clinical
The American Veterinary Medical Association (AVMA) guidelines recommend that a veterinarian should examine an animal and establish a preliminary diagnosis before any alternative treatment, like chiropractic, is initiated. Before performing a chiropractic adjustment, the chiropractor examines the animal's gait, posture, vertebrae, and extremities. The chiropractor may also make neurological evaluations. In addition to spinal manipulation, other adjustive procedures can be performed to the extremity joints and cranial sutures. Those that specialize in horses are referred to as "equine chiropractors."

Certification and requirements 
There are two certifying agencies in North America, the American Veterinary 
Chiropractic Association (AVCA) and the International  Veterinary Chiropractic Association(IVCA). Earning certification from either agency requires attending an approved animal chiropractic program followed by AVCA or IVCA written and clinical examinations. In some locations, a veterinarian must supervise the treatment or provide a referral for the treatment by a veterinary chiropractor.

The JAVMA describes chiropractic as a complementary and alternative treatment (CAVM). Other CAVM treatments include acupuncture and physical therapy. The AVMA Model Veterinary Practice Act includes CAVM in the definition of veterinary medicine, and that standard has been adopted in 20 states . Different provisions are listed for each individual state regarding the use of CAVM on animals, most of which require some type of veterinary input such as supervision or referral. Veterinary chiropractic is not recognized by the American Chiropractic Association as being chiropractic.

References

External links
 American Veterinary Chiropractic Association

Chiropractic
Alternative veterinary medicine